The 2005 Orange Bowl was the BCS National Championship Game of the 2004 NCAA Division I-A football season and was played on January 4, 2005 at Pro Player Stadium in Miami Gardens, Florida.  The game matched the USC Trojans against the Oklahoma Sooners. Both teams entered with undefeated, 12–0 records. Despite only being a 1-point favorite, USC defeated Oklahoma by a score of 55–19, led by quarterback Matt Leinart. ESPN named Leinart's performance as one of the top-10 performances in the first ten years of the BCS system.

The game featured many firsts regarding the Heisman Trophy. It was the first college game to have two Heisman winners on the same field (and on opposite teams): Leinart won the 2004 Heisman Trophy, which was awarded in the month prior to the Orange Bowl, and Oklahoma quarterback Jason White had won the award the previous season. The game also featured four of the five Heisman finalists of 2004: Leinart (winner), Oklahoma running back Adrian Peterson (first runner-up), White (second runner-up) and USC running back Reggie Bush (fourth runner-up); Bush would win the award the following season (although USC returned its copy of Bush's trophy and Bush forfeited the award following the institution of NCAA sanctions in 2010).

On June 10, 2010, USC was forced to vacate all games from December 2004 to the end of the 2005 season among other sanctions as the result of an NCAA investigation into the school's football and men's basketball programs. NCAA investigators released a report stating that a USC player, Reggie Bush, was ineligible beginning in December 2004. The NCAA ordered USC to vacate every win in which Bush appeared, including the 2005 Orange Bowl.  The 2005 Orange Bowl is the only BCS National Championship Game ever to be vacated by the winning team.  However, USC did retain the Associated Press (AP) national title.

Scoring summary

Game records

Entertainment 
The national anthem was performed by JoJo.

The halftime show featured Kelly Clarkson, who performed "Since U Been Gone", and Ashlee Simpson, who performed "La La". Simpson's performance—coming on the heels of a lip-syncing incident that occurred during her appearance on Saturday Night Live in October 2004—was poorly-received, with Simpson receiving a shower of jeers from the crowd at its conclusion. ESPN writer D'Arcy Maine described Simpson as having "[tortured] those in the crowd with each attempt at a note, sounding more and more like a shrieking hyena as she went on", and considered it justification for "why she preferred to lip-sync".

Notes

References

Orange Bowl
Orange Bowl
Oklahoma Sooners football bowl games
USC Trojans football bowl games
BCS National Championship Game
Orange Bowl
January 2005 sports events in the United States